Angel of Salvation is the eighth studio album by the Japanese power metal/neo-classical metal band Galneryus, released on October 10, 2012. The 10-song album featured two songs from the single "Hunting For Your Dream": the titular song and "Temptation Through the Night", the latter which was featured as a "work in progress" version. The full album version of the title track "Angel of Salvation", which interpolates "Violin Concerto in D major, Op. 35" by Pyotr Ilyich Tchaikovsky, is Galneryus' longest song to date at 14 minutes and 42 seconds long; twice as long as the song's music video. The song is also the first to feature a guest vocalist in a studio album by Galneryus in Akane Liv from the band LIV MOON. For the album and tour, Syu switched from a Hughes and Kettner amplifier to a Diezel Hagen amplifier and cabinet. This was also shown in the "Angel of Salvation" music video. Syu reverted to his ESP Crying Star Rebel signature guitar for the "Under the Promised Flag Tour" with modifications to the humbuckers. "Hunting for Your Dream" was used as the second closing theme for the new Hunter × Hunter anime adaptation.

Track listing
All songs arranged by Galneryus and Yorimasa Hisatake.

Credits
Syu - Guitar
Masatoshi Ono "Sho" - (Vocals)
Taka - (Bass)
Yuhki - (Keyboards, Hammond Organ)
Junichi Satoh - (Drums)

Additional credits
Yasuyuki "Buddy" Hirahara - (Instrumental Technician)
AKANE LIV (LIV MOON) - (Female Vocals on Tr. 9)
Syu, Sho, Yuhki, Yorimasa Hisatake - (Additional Chorus)
Yutaka Kuwase (LOGGIA) - (Art Direction and Design)
Shinya Omachi - (Photographer)

Chart performance
The album reached #15 and #17 on the Billboard Japan Top Albums and Oricon album charts, respectively; the highest of any of their studio albums.

References

2012 albums
Galneryus albums